Microcaecilia supernumeraria is a species of amphibians in the family Siphonopidae. It is endemic to Brazil. Its natural habitats are subtropical or tropical moist lowland forests, plantations, rural gardens, and heavily degraded former forest.

References

supernumeraria
Endemic fauna of Brazil
Taxa named by Edward Harrison Taylor
Amphibians described in 1969
Taxonomy articles created by Polbot